This is a list of Rescueman episodes. The anime series was first aired in Japan on Fuji TV from February 2, 1980 to January 31, 1981, and contains fifty-three episodes.

Episodes

References 

Rescueman